Life Hacks (Chinese: 没那么简单) is a Mandarin-language variety show produced by Singapore's MediaCorp Channel 8. It is hosted by Kym Ng and Pornsak Prajakwit together with Henry Thia, Pan Lingling and Jeremy Chan. The show shares tips and tricks to make life easier and save money.

Guests

Show facts
Most appearances

Trivia
More than 50 life hacks were introduced, and a total of 33 artistes and three guest experts appeared on the show.
Episode 12 is the only episode to have an entirely new group of guest artistes, apart from episodes 1 and 2.

References

2016 Singaporean television series debuts
2016 Singaporean television series endings
Channel 8 (Singapore) original programming